Nottingham Harmonic Society is Nottingham's civic choir, and has established itself as one of the leading provincial choruses in Britain.

It started life as the Vocal Music Club of the Nottingham Mechanics' Institution under the direction of Alfred Joseph Lowe formed in 1846, but soon became independent of the Institute under the name Nottingham Sacred Harmonic Society.

List of Chorus Masters
Henry Farmer 1866 - 1880
John Adcock 1880 - 1895
Henry Wood 1897 - 1902
Allen Gill 1902 - 1930
Roy Henderson 1930 - 1937
Herbert Bardgett 1937 - 1960
Noel Cox 1960 - 1973
Andrew Burnham 1973 - 1985
Neil Page 1986 - 2007
Murray Stewart 2007 - 2008
Richard Laing 2009 - current

References 

 Nottingham Harmonic Society
 Performing Arts in Nottingham

English choirs
Culture in Nottingham
Musical groups established in 1846
1846 establishments in England